Lifeguard is a 1976 American drama film made by Paramount Pictures. It was directed by Daniel Petrie from a screenplay by Ron Koslow.  It stars Sam Elliott, Anne Archer, Stephen Young, Parker Stevenson, and Kathleen Quinlan.

Plot
Rick Carlson, a 32-year-old lifeguard on a Southern California beach, is prompted to question his goals in life when he receives an invitation to his 15-year high school reunion. At the beach, 17-year old Wendy (who seems much younger) begins to come on to Rick. He is concerned about her being underage and thus jailbait, but remains friendly with her.

Larry, an old high school friend of Rick's, shows up at the beach to make sure he's going to the reunion. Rick seems ambivalent, but Larry tells Rick his old high school flame, the newly divorced  Cathy, is expected to make an appearance. Larry also offers Rick a sales position at a Porsche dealership. Rick goes for an interview, is ambivalent about the job, but decides to go to the reunion in the hopes of seeing Cathy.

The night of the reunion, Wendy follows Rick home and surprises him at the door. He invites her in while he is getting ready. She is somewhat taken aback to discover that he is in his 30s. But, not too taken aback, as they kiss before Rick heads off for the reunion.

At the reunion, Rick seems embarrassed about still being a lifeguard in his 30s and begins to lie about why he is so tanned. When he finally locates his old sweetheart Cathy, he tells her he works for the county. The reunion serves to rekindle Rick and Cathy's relationship and they begin seeing each other.

Back at the beach, Wendy asks Rick when they will make love again. He tells her plaintively that they are doing something illegal and it would be best if she found someone closer to her own age. Later, he sees Wendy swimming away from the beach and goes out to rescue her. She admits she is trying to kill herself. He takes her to shore and walks her to her car. He tells her that when school starts Monday she will "begin to make new friends" as she drives off.

Cathy works at an art gallery. Rick visits her to tell her about the incident with Wendy which seems to have frazzled him. Cathy comforts him, then invites him to move in with her. While they're discussing the arrangement, an effete client keeps insisting that Cathy wait on him. An annoyed Rick tells him off in a very rude and unprofessional manner, thus jeopardizing Cathy's standing at the gallery.

With the summer season winding down, Larry returns to the beach one more time to offer Rick a job selling Porsches. Rick turns it down definitively, even though he realizes it will probably mean an end to his relationship with Cathy who has been encouraging him to become more upwardly mobile. He tells Larry he will remain a lifeguard "just as long as they'll have me".

As the movie ends, Rick is summoned to the beach changing room as a hysterical woman tells him there is a man in there. Rick asks the man what the hell he's doing in the ladies' room.  The man claims to be a police officer working surveillance but doesn't have his badge because he's working undercover.

Cast
Sam Elliott as Rick Carlson
Anne Archer as Cathy
Stephen Young as Larry
Parker Stevenson as Chris
Kathleen Quinlan as Wendy
Steve Burns as Machine Gun (Harold)
Sharon Weber as Tina

Production
Elliott's parents were lifeguards and he had worked as a lifeguard himself. He was cast after Dan Petrie and his wife saw Elliott on TV in Frogs. The film was finished in August 1975 but held by Paramount until the next year. Elliott held off doing any TV in that time because he hoped the film would establish him in features. This did not happen. However Elliott always regarded the movie as a personal milestone. "Dan Petrie did a great job directing that movie; it was shot for something like only $900,000. Those were the days."

Part of the film was shot in Petrie's own home.

It was produced by Ted Mann.

Most of the lifeguard tower scenes were filmed at the Knob Hill and "Burnout" towers in the South Bay of Los Angeles.

Reception
Lifeguard received mixed reviews from critics. On Rotten Tomatoes, it holds a rating of 40% from 15 reviews. Reviewing the film in The New York Times, Vincent Canby stated: "As a film, 'Lifeguard' is romantic twaddle, but as sociology it's a spontaneous assault on a very American way of life. [...] as entertainment it ranks somewhat above 'Bikini Beach' but below 'Godzilla Versus Megalon.'"

See also
 Baywatch, TV film and TV series starring David Hasselhoff, which also originally featured Parker Stevenson in the cast.

References

External links
 
 
 
 

1976 films
1976 romantic drama films
1970s English-language films
American romantic drama films
Films about lifeguards
Films directed by Daniel Petrie
Films set in California
Films set on beaches
Paramount Pictures films
1970s American films